Kho kho is a popular traditional Indian game that is a variation of tag. Within India, it is played between states in the National Games of India and between franchise teams in the Ultimate Kho Kho league, which has the backing of the Kho Kho Federation of India. At the international level, India plays kho kho in the South Asian Games.

History 

Kho kho has been played for thousands of years within India, having been originally played by players on chariots (which were called raths) and been known as rathera. The game's rules were standardised in 1914, and it was demonstrated at the 1936 Summer Olympics. It was first introduced to the South Asian Games in the 2016 edition. In 2022, an Indian franchise league known as Ultimate Kho Kho (UKK) began, in which several rules of kho kho are modified.

India's performance in international competitions

Men's team

South Asian Games

Women's team

South Asian Games

Federation 
The Kho Kho Federation of India (KKFI) administers kho kho within India.

See also 

 Kabaddi in India

References 

Kho-Kho